Enrico Salvador (born 30 November 1994 in Vittorio Veneto) is an Italian cyclist, who currently rides for amateur team Northwave Cofiloc.

Major results

2012
 3rd Road race, National Junior Road Championships
 4th Overall Giro di Basilicata
1st Stage 3a
2014
 4th Ruota d'Oro
2016
 1st Tour de Berne
 1st Coppa Città di Offida
 2nd Gran Premio di Poggiana
 10th Croatia–Slovenia
2019
 1st Overall  Tour de Serbie
1st Stages 1 & 3a
 4th GP Kranj

References

1994 births
Living people
Italian male cyclists
People from Vittorio Veneto
Cyclists from the Province of Treviso
21st-century Italian people